Michael Paul Pillsbury (born February 8, 1945) is an author, and former public official in the United States. He has been the Director of the Center on Chinese Strategy at the Hudson Institute in Washington, D.C. since 2014. Before Hudson, he held various postings in the U.S. Department of Defense and U.S. Senate. He has been called a "China-hawk", and an "architect" of Trump's signature policy on China.

He was described by Donald Trump as the leading authority on China in 2018.<ref>{{cite news|last=Schreckinger|first=Ben|date=November 30, 2018|title=The China hawk who captured Trump's 'very, very large brain|page=A1|work=Politico|url=https://www.politico.com/story/2018/11/30/trump-china-xi-jinping-g20-michael-pillsbury-1034610|access-date=November 30, 2018}}</ref> Pillsbury is the author of three books on Chinese foreign policy strategy and Sino-American relations. 

Pillsbury's most recent book, The Hundred-Year Marathon, appeared as a selection of the 2017 U.S. Special Operations Command, Commanders Reading List, as was number one on The Washington Post bestsellers list. According to The New York Times, Pillsbury's book "has become a lodestar for those in the West Wing pushing for a more forceful response to the threat that China's rise poses to the United States." Pillsbury's work has not been siloed to the American right, finding bipartisan interest as many Democrats look to continue his work in incorporating a version of Trump's China doctrine in the Biden Administration. In December 2020, the Trump administration announced it intended to appoint him as the chair of the Defense Policy Board.

Career
Pillsbury received his B.A. in history from Stanford University (where he was mentored by East Asia specialist Mark Mancall) before earning a Ph.D. in Chinese studies (under the aegis of Zbigniew Brzezinski and Michel Oksenberg) from Columbia University. He was an assistant political affairs officer at the United Nations from 1969 to 1970. From 1971 to 1972, he completed a National Science Foundation doctoral dissertation fellowship in Taiwan. 

While employed as a social science analyst at the RAND Corporation from 1973 to 1977, he published articles in Foreign Policy and International Security recommending that the United States establish intelligence and military ties with China. The proposal, publicly commended by Ronald Reagan, Henry Kissinger, and James Schlesinger, later became US policy during the Carter and Reagan administrations. He served in the Reagan administration as Assistant Under Secretary of Defense for Policy Planning and was responsible for implementation of the program of covert aid known as the Reagan Doctrine. 

Pillsbury served on the staff of four United States Senate Committees from 1978–1984 and 1986–1991. As a staff member, Pillsbury drafted the Senate Labor Committee version of the legislation that enacted the US Institute of Peace in 1984. He also assisted in drafting the legislation to create the National Endowment for Democracy and the annual requirement for a DOD report on Chinese military power.

In 1992, under President George H. W. Bush, Pillsbury was Special Assistant for Asian Affairs in the Office of the Secretary of Defense, reporting to Andrew W. Marshall, Director of the Office of Net Assessment. Pillsbury is a lifetime member of the Council on Foreign Relations and member of the International Institute for Strategic Studies.

In 2015, a former Central Intelligence Agency director revealed that a book called The Hundred-Year Marathon "is based on work Michael Pillsbury did that landed him the CIA Director's Exceptional Performance Award." The official website has declassified documents and photos that illustrate the book.

Pillsbury's scholarship has been questioned by Washington Monthly assistant editor Soyoung Ho, in his article "Panda Slugger, the dubious scholarship of Michael Pillsbury, the China hawk with Rumsfeld's ear", published in the July/August issue in 2006.

Pillsbury played a role in three Presidential actions:

US–China military and intelligence ties
According to three books, Pillsbury participated in President Jimmy Carter's decision in 1979–80, as modified by President Reagan in 1981, to initiate military and intelligence ties with China.

According to Raymond L. Garthoff, "Michael Pillsbury first floated the idea of arms sales and broad range of American military security relationships with China in a much-discussed article in Foreign Policy in the fall of 1975. Not known then was that Pillsbury had been conducting secret talks with Chinese officials … his reports were circulated to a dozen or so top officials of the NSC, Department of Defense and Department of State as secret documents." According to the book US–China Cold War Collaboration, 1971–1989, "The man spearheading the effort was not a public official, and enjoyed deniability. Michael Pillsbury, a China analyst at the RAND Corporation… spent the summer of 1973 secretly meeting PLA officers stationed under diplomatic cover at China's UN mission… The DoD managed Pillsbury. Pillsbury filed a report, L-32, in March 1974… L-32 was a seminal paper on which subsequent US-PRC military cooperation blossomed." James Mann wrote, "Outward appearances indicate that Pillsbury may have been working with American intelligence agencies from the very start of his relationship with General Zhang… In the fall of 1973, Pillsbury submitted a classified memo suggesting the novel idea that the United States might establish a military relationship with China… This was the genesis of the ideas of a 'China card,' the notion that the United States might use China to gain Cold War advantage over the Soviet Union. The idea would eventually come to dominate American thinking about the new relationship with China."

Arming the Mujahedeen with Stinger missiles
Pillsbury participated in President Reagan's decision in 1986 to order the CIA to arm the Afghan resistance with Stinger missiles. According to the UN Undersecretary General who negotiated the Soviet withdrawal from Afghanistan, "Initially, the Stinger campaign was spearheaded by Undersecretary of Defense for Policy Fred Ikle and his aggressive Coordinator for Afghan Affairs, Michael Pillsbury… The Stinger proponents won their victory in the face of overwhelming bureaucratic resistance that persisted until the very end of the struggle." Mann wrote, "For Michael Pillsbury, the covert operations in Afghanistan represented the fulfillment of the decade-old dream of American military cooperation with China… To help him win the argument, Pillsbury made use of his China connections." George Crile stated in Charlie Wilson's War that, "Ironically, neither [Gust] Avrakotos nor [Charlie] Wilson was directly involved in the decision and claims any credit."

Harvard University's Harvard Kennedy School published what it called the first case study of how covert action policy is made and describes the role of Michael Pillsbury. According to Charlie Wilson's War, "The moving force in this group was an engaging, well-born conservative intellectual named Mike Pillsbury, then serving as the Pentagon's deputy undersecretary in charge of overseeing covert programs. Pillsbury, a former Senate staffer and China expert, had been an early believer in the program…" According to Philip Heymann in his 2008 book Living the Policy Process, "A policy player such as Michael Pillsbury may have absorbed many of the critical rules of the game of shared policy choice without even thinking of them as rules."

Heymann wrote that "providing Stinger missiles was obviously of such importance or political prominence that the President would want to decide. This decision is obviously of that character for several reasons. If approved, we may be furnishing a terrifying weapon to a present or future enemy. There is a small chance that we will encourage dangerous forms of retaliation by the Soviet Union. Even the shift from a "plausibly deniable" covert action to the open support of a guerrilla force fighting the Soviet Union would raise issues in Congress that the President would want to consider in light of his staff's advice."
Pillsbury worked through the secret Planning and Coordination Group. Heymann wrote, "This committee was secret, and public details about it are sketchy… The covert action committee met every three to four weeks. Its existence was not officially acknowledged, although such a committee had operated in every administration since Eisenhower. In the Kennedy administration, for example, it was known as the Forty Committee. Any information on covert actions was protected under a compartmentalized security system given the name VEIL."

Studies of China and the Pentagon's annual report
In 1997–2007, Pillsbury published research reports and two books on China's view of future warfare. According to the Wall Street Journal in 2005, Pillsbury's findings were added to the reports the Secretary of Defense sent to Congress on Chinese military power in 2002–2005. In 2003, Pillsbury signed a non-partisan report of the Council on Foreign Relations task force on Chinese military power. The task force found that China is pursuing a deliberate course of military modernization, but is at least two decades behind the United States in terms of military technology and capability. The task force report stated it was a "non-partisan approach to measuring the development of Chinese military power." He has discussed the threat the People's Republic of China poses to the United States of America with Tucker Carlson.

Government positions
 Consultant at U.S. Department of Defense 2004–present
 Senior Research Advisor at US-China Economic and Security Review Commission 2003–2004
 Policy Advisory Group at United States Department of Defense 2001–2003
 Visiting Research Fellow at National Defense University, 1997–2000
 Special Government employee at US Department of Defense (Defense Science Board) 1998–2000
 Research Consultant at US Agency for International Development 1991–1995
 Special Assistant to Director of the Office of Net Assessment Andrew Marshall 1992–1993
 Congressional Afghan Task Force Senate Staff Coordinator at US Senate 1986–1990
 Assistant Under Secretary for Policy Planning at US Department of Defense 1984–1986
 Professional Staff at US Senate 1978–1981
 Acting Director, Arms Control and Disarmament Agency at US Department of State 1981

Affiliations
 Aided Bank of Credit and Commerce International in avoiding bad publicity in the US Senate after BCCI pleaded guilty to laundering billions of dollars in "drug money laundering, arms trafficking and support of terrorists" 
 Director of the Center on Chinese Strategy, Hudson Institute, 1201 Pennsylvania Ave, Washington DC, 2014–present
 Member of the Board of Directors, Freedom House, Washington, D.C., 2016–present
 Member of the Advisory Council, Woodrow Wilson Center, Washington D.C.
 National Geographic Society, Member of Council of Advisors and Founding Co-chairman of the Explorers Society, 2012-2014
 Eagle Donor to Republican National Committee, with reported donatation of over $100,000 since 2008
 Member, Republican Governors Association, Executive Roundtable, 2014–present
 Member of Washington, D.C. Republican GOP Advisory Council, 2012–present
 Author of number one national bestseller, The Hundred-year Marathon, also published in Korean, Japanese, Taiwan-Chinese and PRC-Chinese edition published by Chinese National Defense University, and published in Hindi and Mongolian; selected as "one of the 10 best books of the year" by The Christian Science Monitor, 
 Member of the Board of Directors French American Cultural Center, 1430 New York Ave, Washington, DC, 2015–present

Published works

Books
Author of two books on China, available at National Defense University Press:
 
 This book has been translated and published in China by the New China News Agency Press
  (editor)

Reports and articles

US China Commission Congressional Reports
 
 
 
 
 
 
 

House and Senate testimonies
 
 

Journal articles
 
 
 
 

RAND Corporation reports
Some of these are available online:
 
 
 
 
 
 
 

References

Further reading

 New York Post Book Review: China's secret plan to topple the US as the world's superpower, February 8, 2015
 Wall Street Journal: Opinion Journal: China's 'Peaceful Rise' Is a Mirage, February 5, 2015

Video interviews
 Fox Business: Mounting Pessimism Over Quick Resolution to U.S.-China Trade Tensions? , Sept 10, 2018
 CNBC: We Need to Narrow Our List of China Trade Demands , Aug 20, 2018
 U.S. House Intelligence Committee'': Michael Pillsbury Testifies before U.S. House Intelligence Committee Mounting Pessimism Over Quick Resolution to U.S.-China Trade Tensions? , Jul 19, 2018

External links

 
 

American sinologists
Employees of the United States Senate
American political scientists
Columbia Graduate School of Arts and Sciences alumni
Stanford University alumni
People of the Soviet–Afghan War
Writers about China
American foreign policy writers
American male non-fiction writers
United States Department of Defense officials
Reagan administration personnel
1945 births
Living people
Hudson Institute
The Institute of World Politics faculty